Balle Vellaiyathevaa is a 2016 Indian Tamil-language comedy drama film directed by P. Solai Prakash. The film is produced by Sasikumar, who also stars in the lead role, alongside Tanya Ravichandran, while Rohini, Kovai Sarala, Leesha Eclairs, Sangili Murugan, and Bala Singh appear in supporting roles.

Plot
Sakthi moves to a new village after his mother, who is a postmaster, gets transferred. He befriends a childless couple and falls in love with Thanikodi, a butcher's daughter.

Cast
Sasikumar as Sakthi
Tanya Ravichandran as Thanikodi
Rohini as Sakthi's mother
Kovai Sarala as Kathai, Sakthi's adopted grandmother
Sangili Murugan
Bala Singh
Leesha Eclairs

Production
Following the release of Kidaari (2016), Sasikumar announced that he would produce and star in a film to be directed by newcomer Prakash. The film began its shoot in Theni in the middle of September 2016. Kovai Sarala and Sangili Murugan were signed on to play supporting roles, before actress Tanya was signed on to play the lead female role. Darbuka Siva and Ravi were signed on as music composer and cinematographer, respectively. Ravi used Red Weapon 8K for the first time in Tamil film industry.

The film was reported to be titled Alapparai, before the title Balle Vellaiyathevaa was confirmed in November 2016.

Soundtrack

Reception 
Film critic Baradwaj Rangan wrote, "There’s no effort in any department of filmmaking, and we’re just left with the sight of M Sasikumar angling for an easy B/C-centre hit. No one can grudge him that, and not every film can be a Subramaniapuram, but is a little quality control too much to expect?"

References

External links 
 

2016 films
2010s Tamil-language films
Indian comedy-drama films
2016 directorial debut films
2016 comedy-drama films